Abell 370 is a galaxy cluster located nearly 5 billion light-years away from the Earth (at redshift z = 0.375), in the constellation Cetus. Its core is made up of several hundred galaxies. It was catalogued by George Abell, and is the most distant of the clusters he catalogued.

In the 1980s astronomers of Toulouse Observatory discovered a gravitational lens in space between Earth and Abell 370.  A curious arc had been observed earlier near the cluster, but the astronomers were able to recognize it as this phenomenon.

Gravitational lensing
Abell 370 appears to include several arcs of light, including the largest ever discovered with 30" long. These arcs or deformations are mirages caused by gravitational lensing of massive and dark objects located between the observer and the distant galaxies. This cluster shows an apparent magnitude of +22.

In 2002, astronomers used this lensing effect to discover a galaxy, HCM-6A, 12.8 billion light years away from Earth. At the time it was the furthest known galaxy.

In 2009, study in the field of Abell 370 revealed a grouping of background galaxies lensed and distorted by the cluster into an arc with the appearance of a dragon, hence nicknamed The Dragon by NASA scientists. Its head is composed of a spiral galaxy, with another image of the spiral composing the tail. Several other images form the body of the dragon, all overlapping. These galaxies all lie approximately 5 billion light years away.

Gallery

See also
 Abell 2218
 Abell catalogue
 List of Abell clusters

References

 Gravitationally lensed images in Abell 370 Authors: Grossman, S. A. & Narayan, R. 
 Image of Abell 370 released bu STScI HST in May 2017 : http://hubblesite.org/news_release/news/2017-20

External links

A lot of galaxies need guarding in this NASA Hubble view

Galaxy clusters
370
Abell richness class 0
Cetus (constellation)